The Flamingo Hotel overlooked Biscayne Bay on the west side of the newly formed city of Miami Beach, Florida, until the 1950s, when it was torn down to make room for the new Morton Towers development, which is now known as the Flamingo South Beach.

History 
The hotel was built by pioneering Miami Beach developer Carl G. Fisher in 1920, designed by Rubush & Hunter of Indianapolis, and opened in 1921. An adjoining golf course was designed by Captain H.C. Tippet. Fisher was determined to avoid the ocean-side beaches where his development partner John S. Collins had established a casino.  He saw the smooth waters of Biscayne Bay as the perfect place for a boat racing spectacle, as an attraction for wealthy and refined tourists.  The automobile racing promoter established the  Biscayne Bay Speed Boat Regattas near Belle Isle as a publicity draw for his large new hotel.  He would continue to stoke the exotic vacation destination image that drove the land boom in the area with stunts like his publicity photos with his elephant Rosie. The Flamingo site overlooks Flagler Monument Island in Biscayne Bay.

In 1935, despite a reservation by the New York Giants baseball team, Jewish players Phil Weintraub and Harry Danning were refused entry to the hotel, which had a "No Jews" policy. However, the hotel backed down and the Jewish players were allowed to stay, when Giants manager Bill Terry threatened that he would remove the whole team to another hotel if his Jewish ballplayers were not allowed in.

References

External links
 Flamingo South Beach in Miami

Hotels in Miami Beach, Florida
Hotels established in 1921
Hotel buildings completed in 1921
Demolished hotels in Florida
1921 establishments in Florida
1955 disestablishments in Florida
Buildings and structures demolished in 1955